The Tehran Symphony Orchestra (TSO), founded in 1933, is Iran's oldest and largest symphony orchestra. It was founded as the Municipality Symphony Orchestra by Gholamhossein Minbashian, before entering its modern form under Parviz Mahmoud in 1946. In the years that followed, conductors such as Rubik (Ruben) Gregorian, Morteza Hannaneh, Haymo Taeuber, Heshmat Sanjari, and Farhad Meshkat took over as the conductors of the Orchestra.

After the 1979 Revolution, many musicians of the TSO emigrated to Europe and the US. For some years Heshmat Sanjari and then Fereydoun Nasseri were the conductors. The current conductor of TSO is Shardad Rohani

1933 - 1979 

In the golden age of the orchestra, many notable musicians like Yehudi Menuhin and Isaac Stern played with the orchestra.

1979 - present 
After the 1979 Iranian revolution, clerics outlawed all pre-revolutionary music, hardline clerics say music comes between the faithful and God, and leads to an impure mind. As a result, the orchestra faced its darkest age, playing only a few concerts in the decade following the revolution. The pressure caused the conductor Heshmat Sanjari a serious sickness, he died in 1995. 
The orchestra still plays concerts once in a while.

Principal conductors 

 Parviz Mahmoud (1946–1948)
 Rouben Gregorian (1948–1951)
 Morteza Hannaneh (1952–1954)
 Haymo Taeuber (1957–1960)
 Heshmat Sanjari (1960–1971)
 Farhad Meshkat (1972–1978)
 Bijan Ghaderi (1980-1982)
 Nader Mortezapour (1982–1984)
 Fereydoun Nasseri (1990–1994)
 Ali Rahbari (2004–2005)
 Nader Mashayekhi (2006–2007)
 Manuchehr Sahbai (2007–2010)
 Ali Rahbari (2015–2016)
 Shahrdad Rohani (2016–2020)
 Nassir Heidarian-Rasty (2020-present)
 Wolfgang Wengenroth (Guest Conductor 2022)

See also
Persian symphonic music
Music of Iran
Iran's National Orchestra
Iranian Orchestra for New Music
Persepolis Symphony Orchestra (Nations Orchestra)
Symphonic Orchestra of Dushanbe
Iran's Children Orchestra

References

External links
Tehran Symphony Orchestra

Musical groups established in 1937
Persian orchestras
Iranian orchestras